Permas Jaya, with the official name of Bandar Baru Permas Jaya, is a suburb in Johor Bahru, Johor, Malaysia. It has about 40,000-45,000 residents. The Permas Jaya Bridge connects it with Kampung Baru Bakar Batu, Taman Sentosa and downtown Johor Bahru. The Second Permas Jaya Bridge is completed and had helped to reduce traffic jams. The new Eastern Dispersal Link has also been completed and opened for public on 1 April 2012.

The residential areas are divided into sections, with the section numbers numbering from 1 to 15 and beyond, based on the phases when the town was built. The roads in the residential areas are further named with a "/" and another representing number, which means 1/13 is a road found in the residential area 1.

Permas Jaya has a 9-hole golf course and residential condominiums. It also has a sports and recreational complex and a go-kart circuit. Permas Point, also known as Permas Complex, used to be the main shopping and leisure complex with a cinema and bowling alley but has been closed since 1999. It also boost a sports complex which has a tennis court, swimming complex and library. Currently, Jaya Jusco is the main shopping centre in Permas Jaya. Permas Jaya Management has built a new Permas Mall to attract new businesses. Permas Jaya is a popular choice for middle class professionals and business people (mainly local Chinese and Singaporeans) as well as a small number of expatriates to live in because of its strategic location between Johor Bahru and Pasir Gudang shipbuilding yards within an area with a population of more than 300,000. There is a bit of a night life and good restaurants, some with live entertainment. There are also many Chinese styled cafes as well as the Jusco Permas Jaya, which is one of the earliest Jusco branches in Johor Bahru. There is a very popular Chinese Tua Pek Kong Temple along Jalan Permas 6/6.

Geography
The suburb spans over an area of 11.6 km2.

Transportation

Road
The town is accessible by bus from Johor Bahru Sentral (T21, S&S 2).

References

Populated places in Johor
Johor Bahru housing estates